Buddhist kingship refers to the beliefs and practices with regard to kings and queens in traditional Buddhist societies, as informed by Buddhist teachings. This is expressed and developed in Pāli and Sanskrit literature, early, later, as well as vernacular, and evidenced in epigraphic findings. Forms of kingship that could be described as Buddhist kingship existed at least from the time of Emperor Aśoka. Important concepts that were used with regard to Buddhist kingship are merit, pāramī, 'person of merit' 'wheel-turning monarch', and Bodhisatta. Many of these beliefs and practices continue to inspire and inform current kingship in contemporary Buddhist countries. Since the 2000s, studies have also began to focus on the role of Buddhist queens in Asian history.

Origins 
In a traditional Buddhist society such as Thailand, the king's role in society and position in the hierarchy was defined by Buddhist cosmography, which considered someone's role and position the result of karma accumulated throughout many lifetimes. In the Tipiṭaka (Buddhist scriptures), ideas about good governance are framed in terms of the ideal of the Cakkavati, the king who rules righteously and non-violently according to Dharma. His roles and duties are discussed extensively, especially in the Mahasudassana Sutta and the Cakkavatti-sihanada Sutta. The Cakkavatti must be a moral example to the people and possess enough spiritual merit and wisdom. It is through this that he earns his sovereignty, as opposed to merely inheriting it. Moreover, he is described to significantly affect society's morals.

Apart from the Tipitaka, Pāli chronicles such as the Mahāvaṃsa and the Jinakālamālī have contributed to ideas of Buddhist kingship. Also, the Buddha himself was born as a prince, and was also a king (Vessantara) in a previous life. Moreover, the Emperor Aśoka is featured in the later Pāli works as an important patron supporting the Sangha. In traditional chronicles, many of the kings mentioned in later Pāli works were considered part of the same dynasty. This dynasty of meritorious kings stretched back until the beginning of the current aeon, and in vernacular Pāli works and pre-modern traditions, the kings of Buddhist societies were linked to the same dynasty, through "ties of incarnation" (Jory). Kings in Buddhist societies identified themselves with traditional kings in Buddhist texts, and this identification was expressed through discourse and ritual.

Kingship and merit-making 

In South and South-East Asia, kingship and merit-making went together. Merit-making was not only a practice for the mass, but was also practiced by kings and queens. In vernacular Pāli works, examples are given of royalty performing meritorious acts, sometimes as a form of repentance for previously committed wrongdoings. Because of these traditions, kings have had an important role in maintaining the Sangha, and publicly performed grand acts of merit, as is testified by epigraphic evidence from South and South-East Asia. In Sri Lanka, from the tenth century CE onward, kings have taken a role of lay protector of the Sangha, and so have Thai kings, during the periods of Sukhothai and Ayutthaya (fourteenth until eighteenth centuries). In fact, a number of kings in Sri Lanka, Thailand, and Burma have described themselves as Bodhisattas, as epithets and royal language were established accordingly. In Thailand, the king was considered a Phu Mi Bun (literally, 'a person who has merit'), who possessed the greatest merit of all people in the kingdom, and whose happiness was connected with that of the kingdom. As of the 1960s, this belief was still common among Thai farmers with regard to King Bhumibol. In short, kingship in traditional Buddhist societies was connected with the Sangha as a field of merit: the king took an exemplary role as a donor to the Sangha, and the Sangha legitimated the king as a leader of the state. The monarchy facilitated the Sangha, and was needed to legitimise and strengthen their right to rule. In times of famine or other hardship, it was traditionally believed that the king was failing, and the king would typically perform meritorious activities on a grand scale. In this way the king would be able to improve the kingdom's conditions, through his "overflow karma" (Walters).

A similar role was played by queens. Besides the role of a meritorious person being similar to that of kings, Buddhist kings and queens also had mutually dependent symbiotic roles. The queen was considered to be subservient as a good wife to the king, but the king was also dependent on the queen's wisdom and spiritual attainment.

Vessantara Jātaka 

In the last seven centuries in Thailand, the Vessantara Jātaka has played a significant role in legitimating  kingship in Thailand, through a yearly festival known as the 'Preaching of the Great Life'. Merit-making and pāramīs were greatly emphasized in this festival, through the story about Prince Vessantara's generosity. Initially, the festival was an important way for the Chakri dynasty to legitimate itself, as Vessantara was the model prince who became king through the power of his merits and sacrifice. During the reform period of Rama IV, however, as Thai Buddhism was being modernized, the festival was dismissed as not reflecting true Buddhism. Its popularity has greatly diminished ever since. Nevertheless, the use of merit-making by the Thai monarchy and government to solidify their position and create unity in society has continued until the twenty-first century.

Kingship and ordination 
Some kings' role as exemplary Buddhist was exemplified by their ordination prior to being enthroned. A well-known example of this was the Thai king Mongkut, who ordained twenty-seven years before becoming king. King Mongkut emphasized a rational approach of Buddhism, which could be reconciled with science. This approach helped him to legitimate his position as a king. Part of the Coronation of the Thai monarch includes the king proceeding to the chapel royal (the Wat Phra Kaew) to vow to be a "Defender of the Faith" in front of a chapter of monks including the Supreme Patriarch of Thailand.

As a topic of conversation 
Buddhism discourages conversation about kings and ministers of state.

See also 

 Ashoka
  Chakravarti
 Dasavidha-rājadhamma
 Devaraja
 Philosopher king

Citations

References

Further reading 
 
 Rao, N. (2016). Royal religious beneficence in pre-modern India: social and political implications. International Journal of Dharma Studies, 4(1), 1-14.

Kingship